WFDR-FM (94.5 FM) is a currently silent radio station licensed to Woodbury, Georgia, United States.  The station is currently owned by Ploener Radio Group, LLC.   Prior to its Hip-Hop format, the station was branded as "Mountain Country 94.5"  with "Today's Country Favorites & Legendary Treasures!" as its slogan. Edgewater eventually began an LMA with Ploener Radio Group mainly to remove any issues regarding W233BF in Atlanta, which shares WFDR's frequency and simulcasts the same programming mainly meant for the larger market.

History of call letters
The call letters WFDR previously were assigned to an FM station in New York City now called WAXQ. Broadcasting on 104.3 MHz, it was "sponsored as a public service by the International Ladies' Garment Workers' Union."

References

External links

FDR-FM
Radio stations established in 1995